Audrey Grace Thomas, OC (née Callahan; born 17 November 1935) is a Canadian novelist and short story writer who lives on Galiano Island, British Columbia.  Her stories often have feminist themes and include exotic settings. She is a recipient of the Marian Engel Award.

Biography
Born in Binghamton, New York, she immigrated in 1959 to Canada, where she attended and later taught at the University of British Columbia. From 1964 to 1966 she lived in Ghana, and some of her stories are set there and in other distant places. In 1987 she won the Marian Engel Award for her body of work.

Thomas lived in Edinburgh, Scotland in the 1980s, and wrote articles for Saturday Night Magazine.

She has three times received the Ethel Wilson Fiction Prize, for Intertidal Life (1984), Wild Blue Yonder (1990), and Coming Down from Wa (1995). In 2008, she was made an Officer of the Order of Canada.

In 2014 she published her eighteenth book, Local Customs.

Bibliography

Novels
Mrs. Blood – 1970
Munchmeyer and Prospero on the Island – 1971
Songs My Mother Taught Me – 1973
Blown Figures – 1974
Latakia – 1979
Intertidal Life – 1984 (nominated for a Governor General's Award)
Graven Images – 1993
Coming Down from Wa – 1995 (nominated for a Governor General's Award)
Isobel Gunn – 1999
Tattycoram
Local Customs – 2014

Short stories

Ten Green Bottles – 1967
ladies and escorts – 1977
Real Mothers – 1981
Two in the Bush and Other Stories – 1981
Goodbye Harold, Good Luck – 1986
The Wild Blue Yonder – 1990
The Path of Totality – 2001

References

External links
Audrey Thomas's entry in The Canadian Encyclopedia
The archives of Audrey Thomas (Thomas Audrey fonds, R11818) are held at Library and Archives Canada

1935 births
Living people
Canadian women novelists
Canadian people of American descent
Officers of the Order of Canada
20th-century Canadian novelists
21st-century Canadian novelists
Canadian women short story writers
20th-century Canadian women writers
21st-century Canadian women writers
20th-century Canadian short story writers
21st-century Canadian short story writers